"Cool Jerk" is a 1966 song written by Donald Storball and originally performed by the Capitols. It became a hit song in the United States and Canada. It was also used in the 1992 American Christmas comedy film Home Alone 2: Lost in New York.

Original version
Released in 1966, it reached No. 2 on the American Rhythm & Blues Singles chart, No. 7 on the Billboard Hot 100 and No. 9 on the Canadian Singles Chart. The session was arranged by Funk Brother Mike Terry, as the Funk Brothers, Motown's house band, played behind the Capitols on the track.

Per one of the Funk Brothers, the song was originally to be called "Pimp Jerk". This was taken from watching neighborhood pimps, who would dance in the clubs but were too "cool" to do the jerk like regular folks. The producer was afraid that a song with the word pimp in the title would be banned or fail to receive much positive attention, and had the title changed to its current form.

Charts

Weekly charts

Year-end charts

The Go-Go's version
The Go-Go's covered the song for their 1982 album Vacation and later re-recorded it for their 1990 album Greatest. A demo that pre-dates their Vacation recording was released on their 1994 compilation Return to the Valley of The Go-Go's.

See also
List of 1960s one-hit wonders in the United States

References

1966 songs
1966 singles
1991 singles
The Coasters songs
The Go-Go's songs
I.R.S. Records singles
Todd Rundgren songs
Songs about dancing